Tim is a 1979 Australian romantic drama film written, produced and directed by Michael Pate in his directorial debut. It stars Piper Laurie, Mel Gibson, Alwyn Kurts, Pat Evison, and Deborah Kennedy, and is based on the 1974 novel of the same name by Colleen McCullough.

Plot
Tim is the story of the developing relationship between Mary Horton, an older, educated and wealthy American woman who lives on her own, and Tim Melville, a handsome, developmentally impaired 24-year-old builder's labourer, whom she hires. Tim lives with his sister, Dawnie, who is a year older than he is, and their parents Ron and Emily. Dawnie marries her boyfriend, Mick Harrington. Dawnie and Mick make clear they dislike Mary and oppose her relationship with Tim, but do not state their reason for feeling that way. Tim eventually marries Mary.

Cast
 Piper Laurie as Mary Horton
 Mel Gibson as Tim Melville
 Alwyn Kurts as Ron Melville
 Pat Evison as Em Melville
 Peter Gwynne as Tom Ainsley
 Deborah Kennedy as Dawnie Melville
 David Foster as Mick Harrington
 Michael Caulfield as John Martinson
 Margo Lee as Mrs. Harrington
 James Condon as Mr. Harrington

Production
Michael Pate first read the book in 1975 and was immediately taken by it. He optioned the screen rights to the book, wrote the screenplay, and decided to direct.

Pate wanted the female lead played by an international actor and spoke with Deborah Kerr, Jean Simmons and Glenda Jackson. Jackson was interested but was not available until 1982 so Piper Laurie was cast instead.

Funding came from the Australian Film Commission, the NSW Film Corporation, Greater Union and Channel Nine.

Filming
Filming took six weeks in August and September 1978.

Release
Tim was released in Sydney on 21 September 1979; with the premiere on 13 July 1979 at GUO's Russell Cinemas, Melbourne.            
In an interview with the Sun-Herald on 20 September 1979, Pate said that the film had run for 12 weeks in Sydney.
On 1 April 1979, the Australian Classification Board announced that the film would receive a PG certificate rating. The film was originally released in the U.S. on 17 September 1981.

Home media
The film has been available  in many markets, with it originally released on VHS and then on DVD. When released on home media in 1984, it was given a PG classification. It was first released in Australia on DVD in 2003 by Magna Pacific with an extra feature of an eighteen-minute interview with the director. A 30th Anniversary Edition DVD was released in the United States in 2009 by Peace Arch Trinity. In May 2011, Germany released it on Blu-ray Disc with little bonus material.

Reception
The film was one of Gibson's first roles, and was moderately successful in Australia, earning Gibson an award at the 21st Australian Film Institute Awards for Best Actor. Kurts and Evison also won Best Supporting Actor and Actress awards respectively.

Box office
Tim grossed $809,000 at the box office in Australia, which is equivalent to $3,163,190 in 2009 dollars.

Critical response
William Thomas of Empire gave Tim 4 out of 5 stars, highly praising Gibson’s role stating that "Gibson sensitively portrays Tim without resorting to the usual facial tics associated with this type of role, and, even when a romance begins to develop between the pair, the film rarely slides into cliché." Vincent Canby of The New York Times gave it a mixed review saying "Tim is the sort of movie that poses a question not likely to be raised by anyone you know: Can a beautiful, 40-ish woman, who is successful in business and remarkably stable in her emotional life, find happiness with a handsome young man, approximately half her age, who hasn't - as he puts it - a full quid?" He summed up the film with "Considering the patent sillinesses of the material, Miss Laurie and Mr. Gibson do very well, and the supporting performers, especially Mr. Kurts, are fine."

Accolades

Remake

The film was remade for American television as Mary & Tim in 1996, starring Candice Bergen and Tom McCarthy in the lead roles.

See also
Cinema of Australia
Tim (novel)

References

External links

Tim at Oz Movies

1979 films
1979 directorial debut films
1979 romantic drama films
1970s Australian films
1970s English-language films
Australian romantic drama films
Films about intellectual disability
Films based on Australian novels
Films based on romance novels